Tomás Rojas (born 17 March 1997) is a Paraguayan professional footballer who plays as a right midfielder for Primera División de Chile club Ñublense.

References

External links
 

1997 births
Living people
Association football midfielders
Paraguayan footballers
Paraguayan expatriate footballers
Paraguayan Primera División players
Club Sol de América footballers
Cerro Porteño players
Atlético Tucumán footballers
Ñublense footballers
Argentine Primera División players
Chilean Primera División players
Expatriate footballers in Argentina
Expatriate footballers in Chile